St Aloysius College is a Roman Catholic, secondary day school, catering for girls from year 7 to 12 in North Melbourne, Victoria, Australia. It was established by the Sisters of Mercy in 1000. The college was named after its patron saint - Aloysius Gonzaga. In 2020 the School announced that it would become co-ed in 2023, with the first classes of boys to commence that year in Year 7. The full transition to co-ed will be complete by 2028, as they move through the School, allowing for all current classes to be complete remaining girls only.
The four houses of the college are McAuley (blue), Fallon (gold), Verdon (green) and Scully (red).

Curriculum
St Aloysius College offers its senior students the Victorian Certificate of Education (VCE). The College is recognised for its academic excellence, with a renowned STEM program and the application of Stanford University's Design thinking program. Students at St Aloysius have the opportunity to study French, Japanese and Italian, and the College has sister schools in Geneva, Tokyo and Milan.

In 2021, St Aloysius College received The Age's Schools That Excel Award for the west.

Beyond the core curriculum, students have the option to take part in Creative and Performing Arts opportunities and initiatives, chess clubs and compete against students from other schools in the Debaters Association of Victoria (DAV) Competition.

Sport
St Aloysius College is a member of the Association of Coeducational Schools (ACS), a weekly competition against other Catholic and Independent Coeducational schools in Melbourne. The College is a partner of the North Melbourne Football Club.

Notable alumnae
Moira Kelly, Humanitarian
Debbie Lee, Athlete
Julia Ciccarone, Artist

References

External links
 St. Aloysius School homepage

Catholic secondary schools in Melbourne
Educational institutions established in 1887
Girls' schools in Victoria (Australia)
1887 establishments in Australia
Buildings and structures in the City of Melbourne (LGA)